The National Human Rights Museum is a national museum of Taiwan (Republic of China) with locations in New Taipei City (Jing-Mei White Terror Memorial Park) and Green Island (Green Island White Terror Memorial Park). The museum was established on March 15, 2018, and opened on May 18, 2018. The museum has collections of documents, research and educational materials relating to the period of martial law in Taiwan and works with museums in Taiwan and internationally.

References

2018 establishments in Taiwan
Museums established in 2018
Human Rights Museum
White Terror (Taiwan)